Saleh Al-Qaraawi is a Saudi militant Jihadist.

Background
Al-Qaraawi fought in the Iraqi Insurgency alongside Al Qaeda in Iraq leader Abu Musab al-Zarqawi. He was a founder of the militant Abdullah Azzam Brigades in 2009, which has carried out a number of attacks in the Middle East. He was identified as the leader of Al Qaeda in Saudi Arabia by Saudi Arabian security officials in a 3 February 2009 list of their 85 most wanted.

In December 2011, the US State Department listed him as a Specially Designated Global Terrorist

Al-Qaraawi was arrested on 9 June 2012 after returning to Saudi Arabia from Pakistan where he had been wounded in a drone strike.

References

Fugitives
Individuals designated as terrorists by the United States government
Leaders of Islamic terror groups
Living people
Members of al-Qaeda in Iraq
Named on Saudi Arabia's list of most wanted suspected terrorists
Saudi Arabian al-Qaeda members
Year of birth missing (living people)